Serting is a small town in Jempol District, Negeri Sembilan, Malaysia.

Jempol District
Towns in Negeri Sembilan